The men's sailors 100 metre freestyle was one of the four swimming events on the Swimming at the 1896 Summer Olympics programme. The second swimming race was open only to sailors of the Greek Royal Navy. Eleven entered but only three actually took part in the event. The winning time was nearly a minute slower than that of the open 100 metre freestyle.

Background

This was the only appearance of an event limited to Greek Royal Navy sailors. The exclusionary nature of this race is a rare phenomenon in the Olympic Games, which in general include only events open to all competitors; Bill Mallon, in his book about the 1896 Games, says of the event that "its inclusion in the Olympic records is dubious at best". However, the competition is included in the International Olympic Committee's database of Olympic medallists, and there is no record of Pierre de Coubertin or any other major figure in the beginning of the modern Olympic movement objecting to the consideration of the race as Olympic.

Competition format

This freestyle swimming competition involved a single race, with all swimmers competing at the same time. The swimmers were taken out by ship into the bay, where they would swim toward shore.

Schedule

The 100 metre freestyle for sailors was the second of the swimming events, held shortly after the open 100 metre freestyle.

Results

References

  (Digitally available at )
  (Excerpt available at )
 

Men's freestyle sailors 0100